Elizabeth Christitch (pen name, Ben Hurst; 1861 – 26 January 1933) was an Irish and Serbian journalist, writer, poet, translator and patriot.

Biography
Elizabeth O'Brien was born in Patrickswell, Limerick, Ireland to John O'Brien of Lough Gur, County Limerick.

She married Colonel Ljubomir N. Christitch (also written Hristić)  of the Royal Serbian Army. After helping to found the Catholic Women's Suffrage Society in 1911, she settled in his home country and during the Balkan War in 1913, she worked as a nurse for the Serbian soldiers. In World War I, she worked in Belgrade for the Red Cross.

Christitch was a journalist for the Tribune, several London daily papers, and the Chicago Tribune as well as contributing fiction to various periodicals. She translated the Serbian national anthem and it was this version that was sung in Britain during the war. Christitch used the pen-name "Ben Hurst". Her best known novel was The Pride of Garr (1925). She wrote on Balkan and international politics as well as women's suffrage and Irish Home rule.

Christitch was an original member of the Serbian Relief Fund Committee. She and her daughter, Annie, were prisoners in Serbia for three and a half years. Christitch gained her freedom through assistance from the Pope. She and her husband had three children. Their son was General Nikola Christitch of the Royal Yugoslav Army and Aide de Camp to both Kings, Alexander I of Yugoslavia and Peter II of Yugoslavia and their daughters were fellow patriot Annie Christitch and Janie Christitch who was later Mother Mary of the Cross. Christitch was given a blessing for her work by Pope Benedict XV. In 1919, Elsabeth Christitch was given a Vatican Papal audience with Benedict XV, the head of the Catholic faith, who was reported as having said "we should like to see women electors everywhere". Christitch died in London on 26 January 1933 due to a weak heart.

Awards and honours
 Christitch was awarded medals from both the Serbian government and the American Red Cross for her work.

Works
Light and Shade in Albania, 1913
A word on woman suffrage
The Slovenes : A Small Nationality, 1918
The Slovenes and Their Leaders, 1918
Church conditions in Jugo-slavia, 1920
Reunion and fusion of the southern slavs, 1921
The Pride of Garr, 1925

References and sources

1861 births
1933 deaths
Writers from Limerick (city)
20th-century Irish women writers
20th-century Serbian women writers